Dawid Żebrowski (Zaborowski) (born 8 January 1997, Racibórz ) is a Polish athlete specialising in the sprint hurdles. He represented his country at the 2018 World Indoor Championships without reaching the semifinals.

His personal bests are 13.69 seconds in the 110 metres hurdles (+1.1 m/s, Gävle 2019) and 7.77 seconds in the 60 metres hurdles (Spała 2018).

International competitions

References

1997 births
Living people
Polish male hurdlers
Athletes (track and field) at the 2014 Summer Youth Olympics
21st-century Polish people